Art Pepper + Eleven – Modern Jazz Classics is a 1960 jazz album by saxophonist Art Pepper and a group of other musicians performing arrangements by Marty Paich, who directed the ensemble.

Background 
The recording is one of several dates Pepper made with Paich in 1959 and is the only one with Pepper as leader. The recording focuses on Paich's large group arrangements of modern jazz classics, including Denzil Best's "Move," Thelonious Monk's "'Round Midnight," Gerry Mulligan's "Walkin' Shoes". Other highlights of the recording are Pepper's clarinet performances on "Anthropology" and the alternate takes of "Walkin'."

Track listing

An expanded compact disc featuring many unreleased "alternate" takes was released on December 1, 1988.

CD expanded release 
"Move" (Denzil Best) –3:26
"Groovin' High" (Dizzy Gillespie) –3:22
"Opus de Funk" (Horace Silver) –3:13
"'Round Midnight" (Hanighen, Thelonious Monk, Williams) –3:32
"Four Brothers" (Jimmy Giuffre) –2:57
"Shaw 'Nuff" (Brown, Fuller, Gillespie) –2:58
"Bernie's Tune" (Leiber, Miller, Stoller) –2:44
"Walkin' Shoes" (Gerry Mulligan) –3:31
"Anthropology" (Gillespie, Charlie Parker) –3:19
"Airegin" (Sonny Rollins) –3:01
"Walkin'" [Original Take] (Richard Carpenter) –5:15
"Walkin'" [Alternate Take] (Carpenter) –4:54
"Walkin'" [Alternate Take] (Carpenter) –4:58
"Donna Lee" [Original Take] (Miles Davis) –3:23
"Donna Lee" [Alternate Take] (Miles Davis) –3:22
Recorded on March 14 (#3, 4, 8, 10), March 28 (#2, 6, 9, 14, 15) and May 12, 1959 (#1, 5, 7, 11–13).

Personnel
Art Pepper — alto saxophone, tenor saxophone, clarinet (all tracks)
Pete Candoli — trumpet (#3, 4, 8, 10)
Al Porcino — trumpet (#1, 2, 5, 6, 7, 9, 11–15)
Jack Sheldon — trumpet (all tracks)
Dick Nash — trombone (all tracks)
Bob Enevoldsen — valve trombone, tenor saxophone (all tracks)
Vincent DeRosa — French horn (all tracks)
Herb Geller — alto saxophone (#3, 4, 8, 10)
Bud Shank — alto saxophone (#2, 6, 9, 14, 15)
Charlie Kennedy — alto saxophone (#1, 5, 7, 11–13)
Bill Perkins — tenor saxophone (#2–4, 6, 8–10, 14–15)
Richie Kamuca — tenor saxophone (#1, 5, 7, 11–13)
Med Flory — baritone saxophone (all tracks)
Russ Freeman — piano (all tracks)
Joe Mondragon — bass (all tracks)
Mel Lewis — drums (all tracks)
Marty Paich — arranger, conductor (all tracks)

References

Sources
Art Pepper & Laurie Pepper. Straight Life. New York, Schirmer, 1979. 
Art Pepper Discography Page (http://www.jazzdisco.org/pepper/)

1960 albums
Art Pepper albums
Albums arranged by Marty Paich
Contemporary Records albums
Original Jazz Classics albums
Albums conducted by Marty Paich